Ağabəyli (also, Agabeyli and Agebeyli) is a village and municipality in the Aghjabadi Rayon of Azerbaijan.  It has a population of 462.

References 

Populated places in Aghjabadi District